Sally Scraggs, Housemaid is a 1913 American silent short comedy film directed by Robert Z. Leonard and starring Leonard, Margarita Fischer and Laura Oakley. In order to find material for her next work, a novelist pretends to be a housemaid and gains employment in a boarding house.

Cast
 Robert Z. Leonard as Frank Norcross
 Margarita Fischer as Doris Lowrey / Sally Scraggs
 Laura Oakley as Mrs. Shackleton
 'Snub' Pollard as Butler

References

Bibliography
 Massa, Steve. Slapstick Divas: The Women of Silent Comedy. BearManor Media, 2017.

External links
 

1913 short films
1913 comedy films
American silent short films
American drama films
American black-and-white films
Universal Pictures short films
Films directed by Robert Z. Leonard
1910s English-language films
Silent drama films